Cold World is the fourth studio album by American rock band Of Mice & Men. It was released on September 9, 2016, through Rise Records. The album was produced by David Bendeth and is the follow-up to the group's third studio album, Restoring Force (2014). The lead single, "Pain", was released on June 27, 2016. Another single, "Real", was released on August 4, and then another new song, "Contagious", on August 29. The album was released early exclusively on Apple Music on September 2, 2016. It received mixed reviews from critics. The album reached number 20 in the US, selling 19,000 copies in its first week. This is the last album to feature Austin Carlile as he left the band a few months later due to his health issues.

Track listing
All tracks written by Austin Carlile, Alan Ashby and Aaron Pauley.

Personnel
All credits retrieved from AllMusic.

Of Mice & Men
 Austin Carlile – unclean vocals, clean vocals on "Real", "Down the Road", "Away", and "Transfigured"
 Alan Ashby – rhythm guitar, backing vocals
 Phil Manansala – lead guitar, backing vocals on "Relentless"
 Aaron Pauley – bass, clean vocals, string arrangements, programming
 Valentino Arteaga – drums, percussion, programming

Additional musicians
 Cassy Colunga – hand claps on "The Lie"

Additional personnel
 David Bendeth – arranging, mixing, production
 Ted Jensen – mastering
 Jake "Scooby" Mannix – assistant
 Mitch Milan – editing, engineering, guitar technician
 Koby Nelson – editing, engineering, programming
 Brian Robbins – digital editing, engineering, mixing engineering, programming

Charts

References

2016 albums
Of Mice & Men (band) albums
Rise Records albums
Nu metal albums by American artists
Albums produced by David Bendeth